The arrondissement of Rennes is an arrondissement of France in the Ille-et-Vilaine department in the Brittany region. It has 109 communes.

Composition

The communes of the arrondissement of Rennes, and their INSEE codes, are: 

 Acigné (35001)
 Andouillé-Neuville (35003)
 Aubigné (35007)
 Bécherel (35022)
 Bédée (35023)
 Betton (35024)
 Bléruais (35026)
 Boisgervilly (35027)
 La Bouëxière (35031)
 Bourgbarré (35032)
 Bréal-sous-Montfort (35037)
 Brécé (35039)
 Breteil (35040)
 Bruz (35047)
 Cesson-Sévigné (35051)
 Chantepie (35055)
 La Chapelle-Chaussée (35058)
 La Chapelle-des-Fougeretz (35059)
 La Chapelle-du-Lou-du-Lac (35060)
 La Chapelle-Thouarault (35065)
 Chartres-de-Bretagne (35066)
 Chasné-sur-Illet (35067)
 Châteaugiron (35069)
 Chavagne (35076)
 Chevaigné (35079)
 Cintré (35080)
 Clayes (35081)
 Corps-Nuds (35088)
 Le Crouais (35091)
 Domloup (35099)
 Dourdain (35101)
 Ercé-près-Liffré (35107)
 Feins (35110)
 Gaël (35117)
 Gahard (35118)
 Gévezé (35120)
 Gosné (35121)
 Guipel (35128)
 L'Hermitage (35131)
 Iffendic (35133)
 Irodouër (35135)
 Laillé (35139)
 Landujan (35143)
 Langan (35144)
 Langouet (35146)
 Liffré (35152)
 Livré-sur-Changeon (35154)
 Maxent (35169)
 Médréac (35171)
 Melesse (35173)
 La Mézière (35177)
 Mézières-sur-Couesnon (35178)
 Miniac-sous-Bécherel (35180)
 Montauban-de-Bretagne (35184)
 Monterfil (35187)
 Montfort-sur-Meu (35188)
 Montgermont (35189)
 Montreuil-le-Gast (35193)
 Montreuil-sur-Ille (35195)
 Mordelles (35196)
 Mouazé (35197)
 Muel (35201)
 La Nouaye (35203)
 Nouvoitou (35204)
 Noyal-Châtillon-sur-Seiche (35206)
 Noyal-sur-Vilaine (35207)
 Orgères (35208)
 Pacé (35210)
 Paimpont (35211)
 Parthenay-de-Bretagne (35216)
 Piré-Chancé (35220)
 Plélan-le-Grand (35223)
 Pleumeleuc (35227)
 Pont-Péan (35363)
 Quédillac (35234)
 Rennes (35238)
 Le Rheu (35240)
 Romillé (35245)
 Saint-Armel (35250)
 Saint-Aubin-d'Aubigné (35251)
 Saint-Aubin-du-Cormier (35253)
 Saint-Erblon (35266)
 Saint-Germain-sur-Ille (35274)
 Saint-Gilles (35275)
 Saint-Gondran (35276)
 Saint-Gonlay (35277)
 Saint-Grégoire (35278)
 Saint-Jacques-de-la-Lande (35281)
 Saint-Malon-sur-Mel (35290)
 Saint-Maugan (35295)
 Saint-Médard-sur-Ille (35296)
 Saint-Méen-le-Grand (35297)
 Saint-Onen-la-Chapelle (35302)
 Saint-Péran (35305)
 Saint-Pern (35307)
 Saint-Sulpice-la-Forêt (35315)
 Saint-Symphorien (35317)
 Saint-Thurial (35319)
 Saint-Uniac (35320)
 Sens-de-Bretagne (35326)
 Servon-sur-Vilaine (35327)
 Talensac (35331)
 Thorigné-Fouillard (35334)
 Treffendel (35340)
 Le Verger (35351)
 Vern-sur-Seiche (35352)
 Vezin-le-Coquet (35353)
 Vieux-Vy-sur-Couesnon (35355)
 Vignoc (35356)

History

The arrondissement of Rennes was created in 1800. In 2010 it lost the six cantons of Argentré-du-Plessis, Châteaubourg, La Guerche-de-Bretagne, Retiers, Vitré-Est and Vitré-Ouest to the new arrondissement of Fougères-Vitré. At the January 2017 reorganisation of the arrondissements of Ille-et-Vilaine, it gained four communes from the arrondissement of Fougères-Vitré and one commune from the arrondissement of Redon, and it lost five communes to the arrondissement of Fougères-Vitré and seven communes to the arrondissement of Saint-Malo.

As a result of the reorganisation of the cantons of France which came into effect in 2015, the borders of the cantons are no longer related to the borders of the arrondissements. The cantons of the arrondissement of Rennes were, as of January 2015:

 Bécherel
 Betton
 Bruz
 Cesson-Sévigné
 Châteaugiron
 Hédé
 Janzé
 Liffré
 Montauban-de-Bretagne
 Montfort-sur-Meu
 Mordelles
 Plélan-le-Grand
 Rennes-Brequigny
 Rennes-Centre
 Rennes-Centre-Ouest
 Rennes-Centre-Sud
 Rennes-Est
 Rennes-le-Blosne
 Rennes-Nord
 Rennes-Nord-Est
 Rennes-Nord-Ouest
 Rennes-Sud-Est
 Rennes-Sud-Ouest
 Saint-Aubin-d'Aubigné
 Saint-Méen-le-Grand

References

Rennes